Yevgeni Yakovlevich Urbansky (born February 27, 1932, in Moscow – November 5, 1965, Bukhara Region) was a prominent Soviet Russian actor.

The creative life of Yevgeni Urbansky was short but very bright. A whole cinema epoch with peculiar aesthetics was created by him in the films Kommunist (The Communist) (1958), Ballad of a Soldier (1959), and Clear Skies (1961). At the age of thirty-three, the actor died in an accident while performing a stunt during filming.

Selected filmography
 The Communist (1957)
 Ballad of a Soldier (1959)
 Letter Never Sent (1960)
 Probation (1960)
 Clear Skies (1961)
 The Boy and the Dove (1961)
 The Big Ore (1964)
 A Span of Earth (1964)

References

External links
 Yevgeni Urbansky's bio
 
 

1932 births
1965 deaths
Male actors from Moscow
Russian male film actors
Soviet male actors
Burials at Novodevichy Cemetery
Honored Artists of the RSFSR
Filmed deaths of entertainers
Moscow Art Theatre School alumni